Pisiktarfik Island is a member of the Arctic Archipelago in the territory of Nunavut. Located at the confluence of Tremblay Sound and Eclipse Sound, it is an irregularly shaped island located near Alfred Point, Baffin Island.

References

External links 
 Pisiktarfik Island in the Atlas of Canada - Toporama; Natural Resources Canada

Islands of Baffin Island
Uninhabited islands of Qikiqtaaluk Region